Heterudea is a genus of moths of the family Crambidae.

Species
Heterudea grisealis Dognin, 1905
Heterudea illustralis Dognin, 1905

References

Spilomelinae
Crambidae genera